Sydney Vacher (2 April 1854 – 11 January 1935) was an English architect.

Biography
Vacher was born in Kensington, the son of Thomas Brittain Vacher (1805–80). He entered a partnership with Evelyn Hellicar in the late 1880s. Their office was at 35 Wellington Street, The Strand, London.  Together they won the competition to design the Valley Primary School, Shortlands, Kent in 1889.

He died at Portsmouth, aged 80.

Publications
Fifteenth Century Italian Ornament, London, Bernard Quaritch, 1886.

Architectural designs
1888:  96 Plaistow Lane, Bromley
1890: Valley Primary School, Beckenham Lane, Shortlands, Kent
Measured Drawings of Westminster Abbey
Pulpit (in Memory of Thomas Brittain Vacher) in St Margaret's Church, Westminster, London
1890:  99 Plaistow Lane, Bromley

Work exhibited at RA 
Vacher's work exhibited at the Royal Academy of Arts included:

1882: West front of Cathedral, Famagusta, Cyprus
1882: South front of Cathedra, Famagusta, Cyprus
1883: Design for an Infirmary, Hastings
1884: A suburban house, Elstree, Herts
1887: Design for tower and spire, All Saints, Peterborough
1890: Design for Post Office, Hertford (with Evelyn Hellicar)

References

1854 births
1935 deaths
People from Kensington
19th-century English architects
Architects from London